Diphosphotransferase are phosphotransferase enzymes which act upon pyrophosphate groups.

They are classified under EC number 2.7.6.

External links
 

Enzymes
EC 2.7.6